George Kosana (December 22, 1935 – December 30, 2016) was an American actor, best known for his role of Sheriff McClelland in George A. Romero's Night of the Living Dead. Kosana had been a member of Image Ten films, whereupon he worked on the crew and was one of the original ten investors in the 1968 classic. Kosana worked on other Image Ten films to include 'The Booby Hatch' and 'There's Always Vanilla', and had often made appearances at horror conventions. Concomitant with his film roles, Kosana worked in a steel mill in Clairton, Pennsylvania, an occupation which led to numerous heath issues.  His last film, My Uncle John is a Zombie, wrapped shortly before his death.  In this final film as well as Living Dead, Kosana reprised and lampooned his role as Sheriff McClelland in Night.

Death
Kosana was found dead on December 30, 2016, at his home in Clairton, Pennsylvania.  His death followed years of battling various illnesses, including emphysema/COPD and macular degeneration.

Filmography

References

External links

1935 births
2016 deaths
20th-century American male actors
People from Clairton, Pennsylvania